Charles Herbert Tompkins (September 1, 1889 – September 20, 1975) was a pitcher in Major League Baseball. He was born in Prescott, Arkansas and played for the Cincinnati Reds.

A single in his only turn at-bat left Tompkins with a rare MLB career batting average of 1.000.

References

External links

1889 births
1975 deaths
People from Prescott, Arkansas
Major League Baseball pitchers
Cincinnati Reds players
Baseball players from Arkansas
Washington and Lee Generals baseball players